Gerry Moane is a Gaelic football manager. Moane had been linked with the Fermanagh vacancy in 2013. Shortly afterwards, he took charge of the Tyrone ladies' Gaelic football team, a role he held until 2020.

References

Living people
Ladies' Gaelic football managers
Year of birth missing (living people)